Cockerell's fantail (Rhipidura cockerelli) or the white-winged fantail, is a species of bird in the family Rhipiduridae. It is found throughout the Solomon Islands (archipelago).

Its natural habitat is subtropical or tropical moist lowland forests. It is threatened by habitat loss.

References

Cockerell's fantail
Endemic birds of the Solomon Islands
Cockerell's fantail
Taxonomy articles created by Polbot